Calophyllum trapezifolium is a species of flowering plant in the Calophyllaceae family. It is found only in Sri Lanka.

References

trapezifolium
Endemic flora of Sri Lanka
Endangered plants
Taxonomy articles created by Polbot